Poillot is a French surname and may refer to:
  (died 1534), French knight and diplomat
 Edmond Poillot (1888–1910), French journalist, aviator and boxer
 Émile Poillot (1886–1948), French organist and pianist
  (1864–1942), French physician and politician

References

French families